Deadly Prey (released in the Philippines as Born to Kill) is a 1987 action film written and directed by David A. Prior. The film, a very loose adaptation of the short story "The Most Dangerous Game" by Richard Connell, stars Ted Prior, David's brother, as a former soldier who is kidnapped for participation in a human safari.

Plot
Colonel Hogan leads a group of mercenaries. His current client is businessman Don Michaelson. A deal is struck, and Hogan recruits new troops. For training, Hogan orders his troops to kidnap innocent people, take them to the forest and hunt them. One of the people they kidnap, Mike Danton, is ambushed while taking out the trash. Taken to the forest, he is stripped to his shorts, greased up and told to run.

A team of mercenaries hunt Danton; however, Danton, a Vietnam War veteran, picks off the troops one-by-one. The troops report this to Colonel Hogan, who sends a task force with his best man, Lieutenant Thornton. Part of the task force is Jack Cooper, a former comrade of Danton who saved his life in combat. Recognizing each other, Cooper defects from the mercenaries and allies with Danton.

With Cooper alongside him, Danton continues to fight off the mercenaries to get back to his wife Jaimey. Hogan uses Danton's family against him, angering Danton. After storming the mercenaries' training camp, Danton destroys all traces of Hogan's mercenaries.

Cast
 Cameron Mitchell as Jamie's father
 Troy Donahue as Don Michaelson
 Ted Prior as Michael "Mike" Danton
 Fritz Matthews as Lieutenant Thornton
 David Campbell as Colonel Hogan
 Leo Weltman as Hillbilly Will

Production
After The Winters Group helped finance David A. Prior's previous film Aerobicide, Prior formed Action International Pictures with executive producers David Winters and Bruce Lewin, and producer Peter Yuval. Their first projects were Mankillers and Deadly Prey. Both movies were shot back to back in and around Riverside, California.

Release
Deadly Prey was first screened at the American Film Market in November 1987. In the Philippines, the film was released by Solar Films as Born to Kill on February 4, 1988.

Home media
The film was officially released on DVD and Blu-ray in 2015.

Reception
The film review aggregation website Rotten Tomatoes lists only one review, on the North Carolina alternative newspaper Mountain Xpress. Reviewer Ken Hanke describes it as "yet another of the seemingly endless barrage of cinematic knockoffs of Richard Connell's short story, "The Most Dangerous Game" also influenced by First Blood (1982), and concludes that it is "all quite ridiculous, but might be good for a laugh if you’re in the mood for ineptitude on an unbelievable scale".

Sequel
A sequel entitled The Deadliest Prey was released on November 1, 2013.

References

External links
 
 

1987 films
1987 action films
American action films
American chase films
Films shot in California
Films directed by David A. Prior
Films about death games
1980s English-language films
1980s American films